The 1982 Edmonton Eskimos finished in 1st place in the West Division with an 11–5 record and won their fifth consecutive Grey Cup championship after winning the 70th Grey Cup.

Pre-season

Schedule

Regular season

Season Standings

Season schedule

Total attendance: 450,560 
Average attendance: 56,320 (93.7%)

Playoffs

Grey Cup

Awards and honours
CFL's Most Outstanding Defensive Player Award – James "Quick" Parker 
Dave Dryburgh Memorial Trophy – Dave Cutler
Dick Suderman Trophy – Dave "Dr. Death" Fennell
Grey Cup Most Valuable Player (Offence) – Warren Moon
Grey Cup Most Valuable Player (Defence) – Dave "Dr. Death" Fennell
Jeff Nicklin Memorial Trophy – Tom Scott
Norm Fieldgate Trophy – James "Quick" Parker
Tom Pate Memorial Award – David Boone

References

Edmonton Elks seasons
Grey Cup championship seasons
N. J. Taylor Trophy championship seasons
1982 Canadian Football League season by team